Barynotus obscurus is a species of weevil native to Europe.

References

Entiminae
Beetles described in 1775
Beetles of Europe
Taxa named by Johan Christian Fabricius